Eglentin Gjoni (born 2 December 1992) is an Albanian footballer who plays for KF Laçi in the Albanian Superliga.

Club career

Kamza
In January 2015, Gjoni moved to then Albanian First Division club FC Kamza. He made his league debut for the club on 7 February 2015 in a 1-0 home victory over Besa Kavajë. He played all ninety minutes of the match. He scored his first league goal for the club on 31 October 2015 in a 3-0 away victory over Ada Velipojë. His goal, the first of the match, came in the 47th minute.

References

External links
Profile at Football Database

1992 births
Living people
People from Tirana County
Albanian footballers
Association football defenders
FK Vora players
FC Kamza players
KF Laçi players
Kategoria Superiore players
Kategoria e Parë players
Kategoria e Dytë players